Kazimierz Żebrowski (4 March 1891 – 1940) was a Polish ice hockey player. One of the earliest ice hockey players in Poland, he helped form the team at AZS Warszawa in 1922, and played with them during his career. Żebrowski won the Polish league championship five years in a row from 1927 to 1931 with AZS Warszawa, and played for the Polish national team at the 1928 Winter Olympics. He died during the Second World War, though an exact date is unknown.

References

External links

1891 births
1940 deaths
AZS Warszawa (ice hockey) players
Ice hockey players at the 1928 Winter Olympics
Olympic ice hockey players of Poland
People who died in Sachsenhausen concentration camp
Polish civilians killed in World War II
Polish ice hockey forwards
Polish people who died in Nazi concentration camps